Anita M. Wilson (born June 19, 1976) is an American gospel music singer, songwriter, and music producer.

Biography
Anita M. Wilson was born on June 19, 1976, and also raised in East St. Louis.  After a 10-year career as a backup singer for contemporary gospel songwriter/producer Donald Lawrence, Wilson recorded her first solo album, Worship Soul in 2012.  The first single released from Worship Soul was "Speechless".

On April 29, 2014, Wilson released the single "That's What He's Done For Me" from her second studio album Vintage Worship. In 2015, her second studio album, Vintage Worship, was nominated for the Grammy Award for Best Gospel Album, losing to Erica Campbell's HELP.

Discography 
Worship Soul (2012)
Vintage Worship  (2014)
 Sunday Song (2017)

References

External links

1976 births
American gospel musicians
People from East St. Louis, Illinois
Singers from Illinois
Songwriters from Illinois
Record producers from Illinois
Living people
21st-century American singers